Dan Păltinișanu Stadium was a multi-purpose stadium in Timișoara, Romania. It was the second-largest stadium in Romania, with a seating capacity of 32,972. Until its closure in 2022, it was used mostly for football matches by the local team, SSU Politehnica Timișoara. The stadium was named after footballer Dan Păltinișanu (1951–1995) who played 10 seasons at FC Politehnica Timișoara. The stadium will be demolished for the construction of a new arena with 30,000 seats.

History 
The stadium was officially inaugurated on 1 May 1963, then named 1 May. The construction of the stadium was done with the workers from the city's factories. Its structure was similar to the one used to build most of the Romanian stadiums of that time, i.e. compacted earth. This constructive solution proved to be extremely problematic, as the compaction of the earth over time led to the deterioration of the stadium. The original capacity was 40,000 on benches, but in 2005, when the plastic seats were installed, the capacity was reduced to 32,972. The floodlighting system, with a density of 1,456 lx, was inaugurated in 2003, at a match against Petrolul Ploiești. Following two general renovations, in 2002 and 2008, the venue was able to host UEFA Champions League games. It was a four-star establishment with all the facilities required for the team, internet for the press room, 30 cameras for video surveillance, electrically heated pitch, an automated irrigation system and a modern scoreboard.

The Romania national football team were also a tenant. The first game played by the national team at Dan Păltinișanu was in March 1983 against Yugoslavia. Since then another six games were played, the last one in March 2010 against Israel.

The stadium has long been in an advanced state of degradation, and will be demolished to make way for a new arena with 30,000 seats. It was finally closed on 25 February 2022, as it no longer met the quality standards. The last event on the stadium was a Liga 2 match between Poli Timișoara and Petrolul Ploiești during which the floodlight dimmed twice and thus the city team lost at the "green table".

Events

Association football

Concerts

References

See also 
 List of football stadiums in Romania  
 List of places in Timișoara

 

Football venues in Romania
Buildings and structures in Timișoara
Multi-purpose stadiums in Romania
1963 establishments in Romania